Vladimir Alexeevich Ussachevsky (November 3, 1911 in Hailar, China – January 2, 1990 in New York, New York) was a composer, particularly known for his work in electronic music.

Biography
Vladimir Ussachevsky was born in the Hailar District of China, in modern-day Inner Mongolia to an Imperial Russian Army officer assigned to protect Trans-Siberian Railway interests. He emigrated to the United States in 1930 and studied music at Pomona College in Claremont, California (B.A., 1935), as well as at the Eastman School of Music in Rochester, New York (M.M., 1936, Ph.D., 1939).  Ussachevsky's early, neo-Romantic works were composed for traditional instruments, but in 1951 he began composing electronic music. He served as president of the American Composers Alliance from 1968 to 1970 and was an advisory member of the CRI record label, which released recordings of a number of his compositions. Recordings of his music have also been released on the Capstone, d'Note, and New World labels.

Teaching career
In 1947, following a stint with the U.S. Army Intelligence division in World War II, he joined the faculty of Columbia University, teaching there until his retirement in 1980.  Together with Otto Luening, Ussachevsky founded, in 1959, the Columbia-Princeton Electronic Music Center in New York City.  While acting as head of the Electronic Music Center Ussachevsky specified the ADSR envelope in 1965, a basic component of modern synthesizers, samplers and electronic instruments. Ussachevsky also taught and was composer-in-residence at the University of Utah.

His notable students include Charles Wuorinen, Alice Shields, Ilhan Mimaroglu, Faye-Ellen Silverman, Charles L. Bestor, Ingram Marshall, Joan Tower, Wendy Carlos, Kenjiro Ezaki and Richard Einhorn.

Discography
"VLADIMIR USSACHEVSKY ELECTRONIC AND ACOUSTIC WORKS 1957–1972". New York: New World Records (80654-2), 2007.
This is a compilation rerelease of recordings originally issued on various CRI LP's in the 1960s and 1970s.
 
Metamorphosis (1957)  
Linear Contrasts (1958)
Poem in Cycles and Bells (1959)
Wireless Fantasy (1960) 
Of Wood and Brass (1965)
Computer Piece No. 1 (1968) 
Two Sketches for a Computer Piece (1971)  
Three Scenes from The Creation (1960; rev. 1973) 
Missa Brevis (1972)

"Vladimir Ussachevsky: Film Music". New York: New World Records (80389), 1990.
Suite from No Exit (1962)
Line of Apogee (1967)

References

External links

Art of the States: Vladimir Ussachevsky
Listen to Ussachevsky's "Incantation for Tape" (with Otto Luening) at Acousmata music blog
CMC (previously known as the Columbia-Princeton Electronic Music Center) history page.
The Music of Vladimir Ussachevsky To Explore
Interview with Vladimir Ussachevsky, October 31, 1987
Vladimir Ussachevsky Interview NAMM Oral History Library (1987)
Obituary of Ussachevsky by Robert Moog from the (Journal of the Audio Engineering Society)
Finding aid to Vladimir Ussachevsky papers at Columbia University. Rare Book & Manuscript Library.
 

 

1911 births
1990 deaths
20th-century classical composers
American people of Russian descent
Soviet emigrants to the United States
Pomona College alumni
Pupils of Howard Hanson
Pupils of Bernard Rogers
Pupils of Otto Luening
Russian male classical composers
Russian electronic musicians
Russian experimental musicians
Burials at Woodlawn Cemetery (Bronx, New York)
20th-century Russian male musicians
Expatriates from the Russian Empire in China